Moina is a genus of crustaceans within the family Moinidae. The genus was first described by W. Baird in 1850. They are referred to as water fleas, but are related to the much larger Daphnia magna and the larger Daphnia pulex. This genus demonstrates the ability to survive in waters containing low oxygen levels, high salinity, and other impurities, including salt pans, and commonly eutrophication. An example of such an extreme habitat is the highly saline Makgadikgadi Pans of Botswana, which supports prolific numbers of Moina belli. 

The Moina are known to be found in various types of bodies of water in Eurasia where new found research indicates that there is an increased presence of biodiversity in regions of Northern Eurasia, Japan and China. According to genetic data, whole the genus Moina is divided into two big faunistic groups: European-Western Siberian and Eastern Siberian-Far Eastern, with a transitional zone at the Yenisey River basin (Eastern Siberia). There is an increase of new phylogroups found in Northern Eurasia, an increase of 4 new Moina species in Japan and an increase of five new lineages in China. In the water bodies of the world, at least 4 species of Moina are non-native species.

Species
Moina contains these species:

 Moina affinis Birge, 1893
 Moina australiensis G.O. Sars, 1896
 Moina baringoensis Jenkin, 1934
 Moina baylyi Forró, 1985
 Moina belli Gurney, 1904
 Moina brachiata (Jurine, 1820) (armed waterflea)
 Moina brachycephala Goulden, 1968
 Moina brevicaudata Вär, 1924
 Moina chankensis Uénо, 1939
 Moina diksamensis Van Damme & Dumont, 2008
 Moina dubia Guerne & Richard, 1892
 Moina dumonti Kotov et al., 2005
 Moina elliptica (Аrоrа, 1931)
 Moina ephemeralis Hudec, 1997
 Moina eugeniae Olivier, 1954
 Moina flexuosa G.O. Sars, 1896
 Moina geei Brehm, 1933
 Moina gouldeni Mirabdullaev, 1993
 Moina hartwigi Weltner, 1899
 Moina hutchinsoni Brehm, 1937
 Moina juanae Brehm, 1948
 Moina kazsabi Forró, 1988
 Moina lipini Smirnov, 1976
 Moina longicollis Jurine, 1820
 Moina macrocopa (Straus, 1820) (Japanese waterflea)
 Moina micrura Kurz, 1875
 Moina minuta Hansen, 1899
 Moina mongolica Daday, 1901
 Moina mukhamedievi Mirabdullaev, 1998
 Moina oryzae Hudec, 1987
 Moina pectinata Gauthier, 1954
 Moina propinqua G.O. Sars, 1885
 Moina reticulata (Daday, 1905)
 Moina rostrata McNair, 1980
 Moina ruttneri Brehm, 1938
 Moina salina Daday, 1888
 Moina tenuicornis G.O. Sars, 1896
 Moina weismanni Ishikawa, 1896
 Moina wierzejskii Richard, 1895

References
       

Cladocera
Branchiopoda genera